Vankoughnet is a surname. Notable people with the surname include:

Bill Vankoughnet (born 1943), Canadian politician
Philip Michael Matthew Scott VanKoughnet (1822–1869), Canadian politician and judge
Philip VanKoughnet (1790–1873), Canadian politician and businessman
Gertrude Agnes VanKoughnet (c.1860–1940), Canadian socialite and second wife of Hugh John Macdonald